Abby McDonald is the pen name for British author Abigail Haas. She has written twelve novels. She was born in England but now lives in Los Angeles. Abby grew up in Sussex and went on to study Politics, Philosophy & Economics at Oxford University. She has written under her real name, pen name Abby McDonald, and has as Melody Grace, self-published her Beachwood Bay series. The series became a USA Today and international bestseller series before she revealed she was the author. She is also one of the writers for Netflix series Bridgerton, and is a staff writer for the show.

Published works
Summer of Love
L.A. Lovestory
Dangerous Boys (Simon & Schuster UK) (as Abigail Haas)
Dangerous Girls (Simon Pulse) (as Abigail Haas)
Sophomore Switch (Candlewick Press) (published as Life Swap in the UK)
Boys, Bears & a Serious Pair of Hiking Boots (Candlewick Press) 
The Anti-Prom (Candlewick Press) 
Getting Over Garrett Delaney (Candlewick Press) 
Jane Austen Goes to Hollywood (Candlewick Press)
The Popularity Rules
The Liberation of Alice Love (Random House)

TV
Bridgerton (staff writer, writer [2 episodes] )

Sources

External links
 

21st-century pseudonymous writers
21st-century British screenwriters
Pseudonymous women writers
Living people
Year of birth missing (living people)
British television writers
British women writers
Alumni of the University of Oxford